Robert Paul Wolff (born December 27, 1933) is an American political philosopher and professor emeritus at the University of Massachusetts Amherst.

Wolff has written widely on topics in political philosophy such as Marxism, tolerance (against liberalism and in favor of anarchism), political justification, and democracy.

Education and career 
Robert Wolff graduated from Harvard University with a B.A., M.A. and Ph.D. in Philosophy in 1953, 1954, and 1957 respectively.

Wolff was an instructor in Philosophy and General Education at Harvard University from 1958 to 1961, an Assistant Professor of Philosophy at University of Chicago from 1961 to 1964, Associate Professor and then Professor of Philosophy at Columbia University from 1964 to 1971, Professor of Philosophy at University of Massachusetts Amherst from 1971 to 1992, and later Professor of Afro-American Studies from 1992 to 2008 and Professor Emeritus from 2008–present.

Scholarship 
After the renewal of interest in normative political philosophy in the Anglo-American world after the publication of John Rawls's A Theory of Justice, Wolff made pointed criticisms of this work from a roughly Marxist perspective. In 1977, Wolff published Understanding Rawls: A Critique and Reconstruction of A Theory of Justice, which takes aim at the extent to which Rawls's theory is cued to existing practice, convention and status quo social science. Insofar as A Theory of Justice forecloses critiques of capitalist social relations, private property and the market economy, Wolff concluded that Rawls's project amounted to a form of apology for the status quo, as according to Wolff, markets and capitalist social relations are founded on exploitation and injustice, and Rawls did not give arguments to defend his theory from these charges.

In The Poverty of Liberalism, Wolff pointed out the inconsistencies rife in twentieth century liberal and conservative doctrines. In this text, Wolff takes John Stuart Mill's seminal works, On Liberty and Principles of Political Economy as starting points.

Wolff's 1970 book In Defense of Anarchism is widely read, and the first two editions sold more than 200,000 copies. This work argued that if we accept a robust conception of individual autonomy, then there can be no de jure legitimate state. Wolff received praise for this work, including, to his surprise, praise from many on the political right such as right-wing libertarians and anarcho-capitalists.

Wolff extended his advocacy of radical participatory democracy to university governance in The Ideal of the University (Boston: Beacon, 1969), in which he argues against rising marketization and external encroachment and that universities should be primarily governed by faculty and students.

Within his profession, Wolff is better known for his work on Kant, particularly his books Kant's Theory of Mental Activity: A Commentary on the Transcendental Analytic of the Critique of Pure Reason and The Autonomy of Reason: A Commentary on Kant's Groundwork of the Metaphysics of Morals. He is also a noted commentator on the works of Karl Marx. His works include Understanding Marx: A Reconstruction and Critique of Capital and Moneybags Must Be So Lucky: On the Structure of Capital, an analysis of the rhetorical and literary techniques employed by Marx in Das Kapital. His textbook About Philosophy is used widely in introductory college philosophy courses.

Wolff is also distinguished as a white man who transitioned from the philosophy department to the department of Afro-American studies of the University of Massachusetts-Amherst, which is chronicled and discussed in his book Autobiography of an Ex-White Man: Learning a New Master Narrative for America.

In 1990, Wolff founded University Scholarships for South African Students, an organization devoted to promoting opportunities in higher education within South Africa for disadvantaged South African students. Since its creation, USSAS has assisted in providing funding and educational opportunities for thousands of students in South Africa.

Personal life 
Wolff was born on December 27, 1933, in New York City, and is the son of Walter Harold and Charlotte (Ornstein) Wolff. He is married to his childhood sweetheart, Susan Gould, and lives in Chapel Hill, North Carolina. He has two sons by his first wife, Professor Emerita Cynthia Griffin Wolff: Patrick Gideon Wolff, an international Chess Grandmaster, and Tobias Barrington Wolff, a gay rights legal activist and Jefferson Barnes Fordham Professor of Law at the University of Pennsylvania.

Wolff splits his time between Chapel Hill, North Carolina, and Paris, France. He maintains a blog, The Philosopher's Stone, in which he discusses philosophy and political issues. He used this blog to publish an online autobiography in a series of posts, which is archived online.

Selected bibliography
 Kant's Theory of Mental Activity (1963)
 A Critique of Pure Tolerance with Herbert Marcuse and Barrington Moore Jr. (1965)
 The Poverty of Liberalism (1968)
 The Ideal of the University (1969)
 In Defense of Anarchism (1970)
 The Autonomy of Reason (1974)
 About Philosophy (1976)
 Understanding Rawls (1977)
 Understanding Marx (1984)
 Moneybags Must Be So Lucky (1988)
 Autobiography of an Ex-White Man (2005)

See also
 American philosophy
 List of American philosophers

References

Further reading

External links

 
 Wolff's blog on Formal Methods in Political Philosophy
 Wolff's archive of essays and tutorials 

1933 births
Living people
20th-century American Jews
Harvard College alumni
Harvard University faculty
University of Chicago faculty
Columbia University faculty
20th-century American philosophers
American political philosophers
American anarchists
Jewish philosophers
American socialists
Jewish socialists
University of Massachusetts Amherst faculty
21st-century American philosophers
21st-century American Jews
Harvard Graduate School of Arts and Sciences alumni